is a private junior college in Iwakuni, Yamaguchi, Japan. The school was established in 1971 as a women's junior college. In 1998 it became coeducational.

External links
  

Educational institutions established in 1971
Private universities and colleges in Japan
Universities and colleges in Yamaguchi Prefecture
Japanese junior colleges